The following is a list of the MTV Europe Music Award winners and nominees for Best German Act.

Winners and nominees
Winners are listed first and highlighted in bold.

1990s

2000s

2010s

2020s

Local Hero Award
MTV Select — Central

Multiple awards and nominations

The following artists received two or more awards:

The following artists received two or more nominations:

One nomination partnered with Casper.

References

MTV Europe Music Awards
German music awards
Awards established in 1999